Samir Modi (born 15 December 1969) is an Indian businessman, and the younger son of K.K. Modi and Bina Modi. He is an executive director at Modi Enterprises, which was founded by his grandfather, Gujarmal Modi, in 1933. He is also an executive director of Godfrey Phillips India and a director of Indofil Industries Ltd. He participated in launching various  initiatives for the Modi Group, including Modicare, Colorbar Cosmetics and Twenty Four Seven convenience stores.

Education
Modi studied at the all-boys boarding school, The Doon School in Dehradun. He then received a bachelor's degree from Hindu College, University of Delhi

Career
Modi began his business career in 1992 as a management trainee for Philip Morris in the US where he promoted Marlboro brand cigarettes. After various stints in the Modi Group's businesses, he launched a network-marketing arm, Modicare, in 1996. The venture began with 12 products and 300 distributors. In 2003, he took over the cosmetics business in Modicare, launching Colorbar Cosmetics for the domestic Indian market in 2004. Over the years, Modi carved out a niche for Colorbar by repositioning the brand as a more exclusive yet affordable product. In 2005, Modi launched Twenty Four Seven, India's first 24-hour retail store chain. Modi marketed the retail chain as a one-stop shop for daily and general necessities.

Personal life
He is the youngest of K.K. Modi and Bina Modi's children. Samir's elder sister, Charu Modi is the CEO and vice-president of Modi Academic International Institute, while brother Lalit Modi is a former cricket administrator, who founded the Indian Premier League (IPL) cricket tournament in 2008. In 1991, Samir married Shivani (née Gupta), whose father runs Delton Cables. They have two daughters, Jayati and Vedika. Their elder daughter Jayati had a small role was part in the 2013 film Gippi.  He received a gold medal in a Delhi state boxing championship,

Philanthropy
In 1996, he set up the Modicare Foundation to prevent the escalation of HIV/AIDS, enhance awareness, and erase the myths and misconceptions surrounding the disease. In 1998, Modi published The Positive Side, a book that promotes AIDS awareness and contains real-life experiences of patients and their battle with the disease.

References 

1969 births
The Doon School alumni
Businesspeople from Uttar Pradesh
Harvard Business School alumni
People from Modinagar
Living people
Hindu College, Delhi alumni
Samir